Maltese bread (tal-malti) is a crusty sourdough bread from Malta, usually baked in wood ovens. It is typically eaten with spread olive oil (Ħobż biż-żejt), where the bread is rubbed with tomatoes (as with the Catalan pa amb tomàquet) or tomato paste, drizzled with olive oil and filled with a choice or mix of tuna, olives, capers, onion, bigilla and ġbejna. The practice of making the bread is considered a 'dying art.'

In Qormi
Qormi is the main city for bread making in Malta, with a large number of bakeries. During the rule of the Knights Hospitaller, it was known as Casal Fornaro meaning the bakers' town. Nowadays an annually held festival, Lejl f'Casal Fornaro (a Night at Casal Fornaro), takes place in Qormi on the third Saturday of October.

The role of bread in Maltese politics

Some of the earliest descriptive accounts of Malta note the dependence of the island's inhabitants on bread for survival. The impact of the British colonial government's liberalisation of the import of grain in 1837 and its failure to provide basic food provisions in the aftermath of World War I are both factors believed to be linked to the Sette Giugno riots.

Bread in the Maltese language

There are a number of idioms in the Maltese language relating to bread as the basis of survival.

(), his bread is baked, meaning the person is well-off.
(),  he has lost his bread, meaning the person has lost their job.
(), what bread does he consume?, an expression used when enquiring after a person's character.
(), he needs it like his daily bread, used when a person is in great need of something.
(), something which provides a lot of bread, used to describe a profitable endeavour.
(), it procures no bread, used to describe a profitless venture.

See also
Forni della Signoria
 List of breads

References

Further reading

more .
 

Dwar il-Ħobż f'Malta / G. Lanfranco. L-Imnara. 4(1991)2=15(29-32) 

Sourdough breads
Maltese cuisine
Stuffed dishes
Tuna dishes
Olive dishes